The Bad Spellers are an indie-pop band from Tokyo, Japan consisting of husband/wife duo Tony Parmenter (guitar, vocals) and Yasuko Ichinomiya Parmenter (keyboards, vocals, toys).

Although officially forming in 2003, the two spent the following 2 years in separate countries, only able to write music together via the internet and on occasional visits. Before "officially" uniting in mid-2005, the band had been featured on a European net-release and 2 compilation discs.

In 2004 The Bad Spellers traveled to Canada to collaborate/record with Justin Langlois of The London Apartments (Universal Records/Beggar's Banquet Records). These sessions were released in March, 2005 to national (USA/Canada) distribution on Florida's Post*Records as "Fall in Love," a split EP with The London Apartments. Tony and Yasuko have since toured between Japan, the US, and Canada numerous times.

2007 saw the release of their first album, "Keep on Shining!", on Post*Records as well as the band's official legal marriage.  The band relocated to the United States in 2009, and currently resides in Brattleboro, Vermont, United States.  In 2012 the band embarked on what would be a successful crowd sourcing campaign to self-release a vinyl LP of "An Album Titled As Ourselves" in early 2013.

Discography
Albums:
Keep on shining! - POST015, 2007 Post*Records
An Album Titled As Ourselves - PCP001, 2013 Pop Co-op

Singles & EPs:
Fall in love - The Bad Spellers / The London Apartments, POST001, 2005 Post*Records

Compilations:
EP Club#5 - 2004 Asaurus Records
For Whom the Casio Tolls - ASA034, 2004 Asaurus Records
Post*Records & Friends present OLE! - POST011, 2006 Post*Records
Stone Soup - NPP001, 2007 Post*Records / Nonsense Records / Pinky Ring Records
GUTS - POST018/SBO003, 2008 Post*Records / Sleepy Bird Orphanage
The Greenbelt Collective Compilation 3 - 2009 GBC
The Starving Artist Compilation CD: Vol. 1 - 2011 The Starving Artist Collective
YOUTH CULTURE DUMMY - BETA023, 2012 Beta Snake Records

Download-only:
Girls Say Moshii net EP - RWB006, 2004 racewillbegin.com

External links
The Bad Spellers @ Bandcamp
Post*Records
Asaurus Records
RaceWillBegin @ archive.org
RWB006 @ archive.org

Sources
 CD review on buzzgrinder.com
 net-EP review on indiepop.it

Japanese rock music groups
Japanese indie rock groups
Japanese indie pop groups
Musical groups from Tokyo